Lichenomphalia is both a basidiolichen and an agaric genus. Most of the species have inconspicuous lichenized thalli that consist of scattered, small, loose, nearly microscopic green balls or foliose small flakes containing single-celled green algae in the genus Coccomyxa, all interconnected by a loose network of hyphae. The agaric fruit bodies themselves are nonlichenized and resemble other types of omphalinoid mushrooms. These agarics lack clamp connections and do not form hymenial cystidia. The basidiospores are hyaline, smooth, thin-walled, and nonamyloid. Most of the species were originally classified in the genera Omphalina or Gerronema. Historically the species were classified with those other genera in the family, the Tricholomataceae together with the nonlichenized species. Lichenomphalia species can be grouped into brightly colored taxa, with vivid yellow and orange colors, versus the grey brown group, depending upon the microscopic pigmentation deposits. Molecular research comparing DNA sequences now place Lichenomphalia close to the redefined genus Arrhenia, which together with several other genera not traditionally considered to be related, fall within the newly redefined Hygrophoraceae.

Etymology

Lichenomphalia is derived from the word lichen combined with the old, shorter, generic name Omphalia from whence the more familiar, longer, diminutive generic name Omphalina was derived. Basically it means the lichen omphalias.

Thallus names and nomenclature

Long before the connection was made between the nonlichenized agaric fruitbodies and the lichenized thalli, botanists and lichenologists named the asexual lichen thalli of Lichenomphalia species several times in a number of genera. Linnaeus in 1753 described the lichen thallus of L. umbellifera as an 'alga' named Byssus botryoides while simultaneously including the fruitbodies of L. umbellifera within his concept of Agaricus umbelliferus, the basionym for the name L. umbellifera. Byssus botryoides is the type species of the now officially rejected generic names Phytoconis and Botrydina. Acharius in 1810 described the thalli of L. hudsoniana as a lichen, Endocarpon viride, which is the type of another officially rejected name, Coriscium. The names 'Botrydina' and 'Coriscium' are often used to describe the thalli of different Lichenomphalia even though they are rejected names listed in the International Code of Botanical Nomenclature (Appendix V). Prior to officially rejecting these names, the names Botrydina and Phytoconis were both applied to describe Lichenomphalia species. Hence literature on these lichenized agarics appears under a myriad of names, such as Omphalina, Gerronema, Phytoconis, Botrydina and Coriscium.

Species

, Species Fungorum accepts 15 species of Lichenomphalia.
Lichenomphalia alpina 
Lichenomphalia altoandina  – Chile
Lichenomphalia aurantiaca  – Colombia
Lichenomphalia chromacea  – Australia
Lichenomphalia cinereispinula  – Europe
Lichenomphalia hudsoniana  – widespread in Northern Hemisphere
Lichenomphalia lobata  – Colombia; Ecuador; Venezuela
Lichenomphalia luteovitellina 
Lichenomphalia meridionalis 
Lichenomphalia oreades 
Lichenomphalia pararustica 
Lichenomphalia tasmanica  – Tasmania, Australia
Lichenomphalia umbellifera  – widespread in Northern Hemisphere
Lichenomphalia velutina  – southern South America
Lichenomphalia wallacei

See also
List of Agaricales genera

References

External links

  Lichenomphalia umbellifera
  Lichenomphalia umbellifera
  Lichenomphalia alpina
  Lichenomphalia hudsoniana thalli originally called Coriscium viride
  Lichenomphalia chromacea from Australia.

Agaricales genera
Lichen genera
Hygrophoraceae
Basidiolichens
Taxa described in 2002